Chester Keller Carmichael   was a Major League Baseball pitcher for the 1909-10 Cincinnati Reds.

External links

Major League Baseball pitchers
Cincinnati Reds players
Baseball players from Indiana
1888 births
1960 deaths
Cedar Rapids Rabbits players
Buffalo Bisons (minor league) players
Chattanooga Lookouts players